The Nein is an indie rock band from Durham, North Carolina, and is composed of former members of The White Octave, Steel Pole Bath Tub, and Piedmont Charisma.  The band is signed to the Canadian label Sonic Unyon.

Biography

Finn Cohen, Robert Biggers, and Casey Burns formed the group in early 2003 in Durham, North Carolina.  After self-releasing a handful of EPs, the band signed to Sonic Unyon and released their self-titled debut EP.  Dale Flattum joined the group in 2004 and the group released their full-length album, Wrath of Circuits in 2005 on Sonic Unyon (with a vinyl version release on Red Strings Records later that year).  Burns left the group in early 2006, and the group began work on new material and future touring with Josh Carpenter (of Asheville, North Carolina).  In September, 2006, Sonic Unyon released an EP of material previously recorded with Burns, entitled Transitionalisms, which preceded the release of their second full-length album Luxury.

Discography

Studio albums
Wrath of Circuits (CD/LP) - Sonic Unyon - May 17, 2005
Luxury (CD/LP) - Sonic Unyon - February 20, 2007

EPs
Demo (2003 · Self-Released)
Twelve Thirteen Fourteen (2004 · Self-Released)
The Nein EP (2004 · Sonic Unyon)
Canadian Tour EP (2004 · Self-Released)
Split 7" w/ Cantwell, Gomez & Jordan (2006 · Sit-n-Spin Records)
Transitionalisms EP (2006 · Sonic Unyon)

Miscellaneous Releases
We Get Lost (2013 · Semiotic Crouton Records)

Previous and related groups and aliases
Robert Biggers: The White Octave, Cold Sides, Erie Choir, Gold Chainz, Audubon Park
Casey Burns: Soundtrack, Gold Chainz, Casey Burns (Illustrator)
Josh Carpenter: Piedmont Charisma, The Makeout Room, On the Take
Finn Cohen: Fura, The White Octave, Gold Chainz, Audubon Park, Sunshine Radio
Dale Flattum: Steel Pole Bath Tub, Milk Cult, Agent Nova, Sunshine Radio, TOOTH

References

External links

The Nein discography at Rate Your Music
Casey Burns: Illustration & Design
Sonic Unyon's website
Tooth: Art

Indie rock musical groups from North Carolina
Sonic Unyon artists